This list is of the Places of Scenic Beauty of Japan located within the Urban Prefecture of Ōsaka.

National Places of Scenic Beauty
As of 1 July 2020, six Places have been designated at a national level.

Prefectural Places of Scenic Beauty
As of 12 March 2020, seven Places have been designated at a prefectural level.

Municipal Places of Scenic Beauty
As of 1 May 2019, eleven Places have been designated at a municipal level.

Registered Places of Scenic Beauty
As of 1 July 2020, three Monuments have been registered (as opposed to designated) as Places of Scenic Beauty at a national level.

"Old" Prefectural Places of Scenic Beauty

See also
 Cultural Properties of Japan
 List of Historic Sites of Japan (Ōsaka)
 List of parks and gardens of Ōsaka Prefecture
 List of Cultural Properties of Japan - paintings (Ōsaka)

References

External links
  Cultural Properties of Ōsaka Prefecture

Tourist attractions in Osaka Prefecture
Places of Scenic Beauty